Kévin Le Cunff (born 16 March 1988 in Paris) is a French cyclist, who currently rides for French amateur team Dunkerque Grande Littoral–Cofidis.

Major results
2016
 3rd Paris–Chauny
2017
 5th Boucles de l'Aulne
 5th Tro-Bro Léon
 8th Tour de Vendée
 9th Paris–Camembert
2018
 1st Boucles de l'Aulne
 5th Tour du Doubs
2019
 4th Grand Prix de Plumelec-Morbihan
 8th Overall Boucles de la Mayenne
 8th Tro-Bro Léon
 9th Classic Loire Atlantique
 9th Grand Prix d'Ouverture La Marseillaise
 10th La Drôme Classic
 10th La Roue Tourangelle
2022
 7th Grand Prix de la Somme

References

External links

 
 
 

1988 births
Living people
French male cyclists
Cyclists at the 2020 Summer Paralympics
20th-century French people
21st-century French people